Monroe E. Hawkins was a state legislator in Arkansas. He attended the 1868 Arkansas Constitutional Convention and served in the Arkansas House of Representatives. A Republican, he represented Lafayette County, Arkansas. He served in the House from 1868 to 1869 and 1873 to 1874.

He was born in North Carolina where he was enslaved from birth.

See also
African-American officeholders during and following the Reconstruction era

References

African-American state legislators in Arkansas
Republican Party members of the Arkansas House of Representatives
19th-century American politicians
People from North Carolina
Year of birth missing
Year of death missing
African-American politicians during the Reconstruction Era
American freedmen
People from Lafayette County, Arkansas